The 2022–23 Liga II (referred to as the Liga II Casa Pariurilor for sponsorship reasons) will be the 83rd season of the Liga II, the second tier of the Romanian football league system. A total of 20 teams contest the league.

It will be the seventh Liga II season with a single series. The first two teams will promote to Liga I at the end of the season and the third-placed and fourth-placed team will play a play-off match against the 13th-placed and 14th-placed team from Liga I. The last five teams will relegate to Liga III. The season is scheduled to begin on 6 August 2022 and to end in June 2023.

Teams

Team changes

Excluded teams
Academica Clinceni and Gaz Metan Mediaș relegated to Liga II at the end of the 2021–22 Liga I season. On 27 June 2022, Academica and Gaz Metan were relegated directly to Liga III, by the Romanian Football Federation, which denied a second tier licence for both clubs, due to important financial problems and unpaid debts to current and former players and managers.

Renamed teams
FC Buzău was renamed back as FC Gloria Buzău, due to brand rights.

Teams spared from relegation
Due to Academica and Gaz Metan exclusion by the Romanian Football Federation, their places were occupied by Politehnica Timișoara and Unirea Constanța, best two ranked teams from the relegated five registered at the 2021–22 Liga II.

Venues

Personnel and kits

Note: Flags indicate national team as has been defined under FIFA eligibility rules. Players and Managers may hold more than one non-FIFA nationality.

Managerial changes

Regular season

League table

Season results

Statistics

Top scorers 
Updated to matches played on 12 March 2023.

Promotion play-off
A promotion play-off tournament between the best 6 teams (after 19 rounds) will be played to decide the two teams that will be promoted to Liga I, meanwhile the third-placed and fourth-placed teams would play another play-off match against the 13th-placed and 14th-placed teams from Liga I. The teams will start the promotion play-offs with all the points accumulated in the regular season.

Play-off table

Positions by round

Relegation play-out
A relegation play-out tournament between the last 14 ranked teams at the end of the regular season was played to decide the five teams that will be relegated to Liga III. Two play-out groups were made: the first group consisted of teams ranked 7, 10, 11, 14, 15, 18 and 19, and the second group consisted of teams ranked 8, 9, 12, 13, 16, 17 and 20, at the end of the regular season. The teams started the relegation play-out with all the points accumulated in the regular season. Two teams from each group were relegated to Liga III, while the 5th placed teams in both groups will meet in a tie to avoid relegation.

Liga I Promotion/relegation play-offs
The 13th and 14th-placed teams of the Liga I faces the 3rd and 4th-placed team of the Liga II.

Liga II play-out
The 5th-placed teams of the Liga II relegation play-out groups face each other in order to determine the last relegated team to Liga III.

References

2022-23
Rom
2022–23 in Romanian football
Current association football seasons